Kwak Kyung-taek (born 23 May 1966) is a South Korean film director best known for his 2001 record-breaking film Friend.

Career 
Friend, a drama where conflicting criminal alliances turn old friends into enemies, set a new Korean box office record with an audience of 8 million, and he received the Holden Award for the Best Script at the 2001 Torino Film Festival. In 2003 he received an award at the Philadelphia Film Festival for the boxing drama film Champion. His 2005 action film Typhoon, however, was a commercial failure.

Filmography as director 
 3pm Bathhouse Paradise (1997)
 Dr. K (1999)
 Friend (2001)
 Champion (2002)
 Mutt Boy (2003)
 Typhoon (2005)
 A Love (2007)
 Eye for an Eye (2008)
 Pained (2011)
 The Ugly Duckling (2012)
 Friend: The Great Legacy (2013)
 The Classified File (2015)
 RV: Resurrected Victims (2017)
 The Battle of Jangsari (2019)

External links 
 
 

1966 births
Living people
South Korean film directors
People from Busan
South Korean Buddhists